Vincent George Hannaford (25 April 1885 – 6 March 1919) was  a former Australian rules footballer who played with Richmond in the Victorian Football League (VFL).

Notes

External links 
 
 
 Vin Hannaford, at The VFA Project.

1885 births
1919 deaths
Australian rules footballers from Melbourne
Australian Rules footballers: place kick exponents
Richmond Football Club players